There are over 9,000 Grade I listed buildings in England.  This page is a list of these buildings in the county of Warwickshire, by district.

North Warwickshire

|}

Nuneaton and Bedworth

|}

Rugby

|}

Stratford-on-Avon

|}

Warwick

|}

See also
 Grade II* listed buildings in Warwickshire

Notes

References
National Heritage List for England

External links

 
Warwickshire
Lists of listed buildings in Warwickshire